Air-cooled engines rely on the circulation of air directly over heat dissipation fins or hot areas of the engine to cool them in order to keep the engine within operating temperatures. In all combustion engines, a great percentage of the heat generated (around 44%) escapes through the exhaust, not through the metal fins of an air-cooled engine (12%). About 8% of the heat energy is transferred to the oil, which although primarily meant for lubrication, also plays a role in heat dissipation via a cooler. Air-cooled engines are used generally in applications which would not suit liquid cooling, as such modern air-cooled engines are used in motorcycles, general aviation aircraft, lawn mowers, generators, outboard motors, pump sets, saw benches and auxiliary power units.

Introduction

Most modern internal combustion engines are cooled by a closed circuit carrying liquid coolant through channels in the engine block and cylinder head, where the coolant absorbs heat, to a heat exchanger or radiator where the coolant releases heat into the air (or raw water, in the case of marine engines). Thus, while they are not ultimately cooled by the liquid, because of the liquid-coolant circuit they are known as water-cooled. In contrast, heat generated by an air-cooled engine is released directly into the air. Typically this is facilitated with metal fins covering the outside of the Cylinder Head and cylinders which increase the surface area that air can act on. Air may be force fed with the use of a fan and shroud to achieve efficient cooling with high volumes of air or simply by natural air flow with well designed and angled fins.

In all combustion engines, a great percentage of the heat generated (around 44%) escapes through the exhaust, not through either a liquid cooling system nor through the metal fins of an air-cooled engine (12%). About 8% of the heat energy finds its way into the oil, which although primarily meant for lubrication, also plays a role in heat dissipation via a cooler. Air cooled engines usually run noisier, however it provides more simplicity which gives benefits when it comes to servicing and part replacement and is usually cheaper to be maintained.

Applications

Road vehicles

Many motorcycles use air cooling for the sake of reducing weight and complexity. Few current production automobiles have air-cooled engines (such as Tatra 815), but historically it was common for many high-volume vehicles. The orientation of the engine cylinders is commonly found in either single-cylinder or coupled in groups of two, and cylinders are commonly oriented in a horizontal fashion as a Flat engine, while vertical Straight-four engine have been used. Examples of past air-cooled road vehicles, in roughly chronological order, include:
 Franklin (1902-1934)
 New Way (1905) - limited production run out from the "CLARKMOBILE"
 Chevrolet Series M Copper-Cooled (1921-1923) (very few built)
 Tatra all-wheel-drive military trucks
 Tatra 11 (1923-1927) and subsequent models
 Tatra T77 (1934-1938)
 Tatra T87 (1936-1950)
 Tatra T97 (1936-1939)
 Tatra T600 Tatraplan (1946-1952)
 Tatra T603 (1955-1975)
 Tatra T613 (1974-1996)
 Tatra T700 (1996-1999)
 Crosley (1939-1945)
 The East German Trabant (1957-1991)
 Trabant 500 (1957-1962)
 Trabant 600 (1962-1965)
 Trabant 601 (1964-1989)
 ZAZ Zaporozhets (1958-1994)
 Fiat 500 (1957-1975)
 Fiat 126 (1972-1987)
 Porsche 356 (1948-1965)
 Porsche 911 (1964-1998)
 Porsche 912 (1965-1969, 1976)
 VW-Porsche 914 (1969-1976)
 The Volkswagen Beetle, Type 2, SP2, Karmann Ghia, and Type 3 all utilized the same air-cooled engine (1938-2013) with various displacements
 Volkswagen Type 2 (T3) (1979–1982)
 Volkswagen Type 4 (1968-1974)
 Volkswagen Gol (G1) (1980-1986)
 Toyota U engine (1961-1976)
 Chevrolet Corvair (1960-1969)
 Citroën 2CV (1948-1990) (Featured a high pressure oil cooling system, and used a fan bolted to the crankshaft end)
 Citroën GS and GSA
 Honda 1300 (1969-1973)
 NSU Prinz
 Royal Enfield Motorcycles (India): The 350cc and 500cc Twinspark motorcycle engines are air-cooled
 Oltcit Club (1981–1995)T13/653, G11/631 and VO36/630
 Demak Dzm 200 2015

Aviation

Most aviation piston engines are air-cooled. While water cooled engines were widely used from the early days of flight, air cooled engines were the dominant choice in aircraft. Following the Second World War, turbojets and jet turbine powered aircraft have come to dominate flight regimes where water cooled piston engines offered the advantage of reduced drag. Today, piston engines are mostly used in slower general aviation aircraft where the greater drag produced by air cooled engines is not a major disadvantage. Therefore, most aero engines produced today are of the air cooled variety. Today, most of the engines currently (2005) manufactured by Lycoming and Continental are used by major manufacturers of light aircraft Cirrus, Cessna and so on.

Other engine manufactures using air-cooled engine technology are ULPower and Jabiru, more active in the Light-Sport Aircraft (LSA) and ultralight aircraft market. Rotax uses a combination of air-cooled cylinders and liquid-cooled cylinder heads.

Diesel engines
Some small diesel engines, e.g. those made by Deutz AG and Lister Petter are air-cooled. Probably the only big Euro 5 truck air-cooled engine (V8 320 kW power 2100 N·m torque one) is being produced by Tatra.

Stationary or portable engines

Stationary or portable engines were commercially introduced early in the 1900s. The first commercial production was by the New Way Motor Company of Lansing, Michigan, US. The company produced air-cooled engines in single and twin cylinders in both horizontal and vertical cylinder format. Subsequent to their initial production which was exported worldwide, other companies took up the advantages of this cooling method, especially in small portable engines. Applications include mowers, generators, outboard motors, pump sets, saw benches and auxiliary power plants and more.

References

Bibliography

Cited sources

Further reading

P V Lamarque, "The design of cooling fins for Motor-Cycle Engines". Report of the Automobile Research Committee, Institution of Automobile Engineers Magazine, March 1943 issue, and also in "The Institution of Automobile Engineers. Proceedings XXXVII, Session 1942-1943, pp 99-134 and 309-312.
Julius Mackerle, "Air-cooled Automotive Engines", Charles Griffin & Company Ltd., London 1972.

Engines